The Artists' Benevolent Fund was instituted in 1810 and incorporated by royal charter on 2 August 1827. It has also been referred to as the Artists' Fund and the Artists' Joint Stock Fund.

As of 1851, it was one of two charitable funds established for purposes relative to those who had been unfortunate in the practice of the fine arts, the other being the Artists' General Benevolent Institution.

As of 1852, it consisted of two separate and distinct branches: the Artists' Annuity Fund, and the Artists' Benevolent Fund. The first was supported by the contributions of its members, for their own relief in sickness or superannuation. All artists of merit in painting, sculpture, architecture, and engraving, were eligible to become members, the annual payments to which were regulated by the age of the member, increasing a small sum every year. The amount of funded property was £14,900, exclusively the property of the members themselves. The second was supported by the patrons of the Fine Arts, for the relief of the widows and orphans of the members of the Annuity Fund. And the whole was under the direction of the president, and ten subscribers to the Benevolent Fund, annually elected by the subscribers, and five members of the Annuity Fund, annually elected by its members. Every artist proposed as a member of the Annuity Fund, had to be balloted for, and approved by the committee of the Benevolent Fund, in order to entitle his widow and children to its benefits. The benefits of this fund were extended to about 40 widows and 22 orphans, the former receiving £18, and the latter £5 annually. The income for this purpose was about £1,200 per annum, derived half from dividends, and the other half from present voluntary contributions.

John Young was honorary secretary of the Artists' Benevolent Fund from 6 December 1810 to 4 May 1813.

References
"The Artists' Benevolent Fund" in  The Metropolitan Charities. Sampson Low. London. 1844. Page 75.
John Pye. Patronage of British Art, An Historical Sketch. Longman, Brown, Green and Longmans. Paternoster Row, London. 1845. Page 323 et seq.
"The Artists' Benevolent Fund". The Spectator. 18 May 1850. Page 15.

External links

The Society for the Management and Distribution of the Artists' Fund - Benevolent Fund. Open Charities.

Charities based in Hertfordshire
1810 establishments in the United Kingdom